Jordanita graeca is a moth of the family Zygaenidae. It is found from southern Slovakia through Hungary, the Balkan Peninsula, Rhodes and Cyprus to southern Russia, Ukraine, Transcaucasia, Turkey, Iran and northern Iraq.

The length of the forewings is 7.5–12.5 mm for males and 7–12 mm for females. Adults are on wing from May to July.

The larvae of subspecies graeca feed on Centaurea melitensis and Cirsium creticum, while the larvae of subspecies sultana feed on Centaurea solstitialis, Centaurea salonitana, Carduus arabicus, Carduus uncinatus, Jurinea sordida and Xeranthemum annuum. Pupation takes place in a cocoon in the soil beneath the host plant.

Subspecies
Jordanita graeca graeca (from Slovakia, Hungary and Ukraine to south-western Turkey)
Jordanita graeca sultana (Alberti, 1937) (the Crimea, central and southern Turkey and Armenia)

References

C. M. Naumann, W. G. Tremewan: The Western Palaearctic Zygaenidae. Apollo Books, Stenstrup 1999,

External links
Fauna Europaea

Procridinae
Moths described in 1907
Moths of Europe
Moths of Asia